Sudhir Vasudeva is the former Chairman and Managing Director of Oil and Natural Gas Corporation. and Chairperson of Board of Governors of National Institute of Technology, Raipur. He has been the head of 14 different companies and currently holds the position of Chairman of Mangalore Special Economic Zone, President for All India Public Sector Sports Promotion Board and President at Global Compact Network India.

Education 
He is a graduate in Chemical Engineering (1971–1975) from National Institute of Technology, Raipur.

References 

Indian chairpersons of corporations
Living people
National Institute of Technology, Raipur alumni
Oil and Natural Gas Corporation
Year of birth missing (living people)